Toubkal National Park is a national park in the High Atlas mountain range, 70 kilometres from Marrakesh in central-western Morocco. Established in 1942, it covers an area of 380 km2. Jbel Toubkal is the highest peak of the park at 4,167 metres.

Main attractions
The Toubkal National Park offers many attractions to visitors. Climbing to the mount peak takes 2-days and offers flowery landscapes during spring and colorful forests of cedar oaks and junipers during the fall. The rural village of Imlil, surrounded by mountains, is a stop point to immerse in dwellers simple life. The ecomuseum of the Toubkal National Park showcases the history of the park and the ongoing projects about sustainability and protection of endangered species.

Archeological sites
In October 2012 Salafists were blamed for destroying an 8,000-year-old petroglyph within the park that depicted the Sun as a divinity.

Mountains

The park contains the following mountains:

 Toubkal (4167 m)
 Ouanoukrim (4089 m )
 Plateau de Tazarhart (3995 m)
 L'Aksoual ( 3910 m)
 Ineghmar (3892 m)
 Bou Iguenouane (3882m)
 Le Tichki (3753 m)
 Azrou Tamadout (3664 m)

References

Geography of Drâa-Tafilalet
Geography of Marrakesh-Safi
Geography of Souss-Massa
National parks of Morocco